Sheelavathi is a 1967 Indian Malayalam film, directed by P. B. Unni. The film stars Sathyan, K. R. Vijaya, P. J. Antony and Sankaradi in the lead roles. The film had musical score by G. Devarajan.

Cast
Sathyan as Ugrathapassu
K. R. Vijaya as Sheelaavathi
P. J. Antony as Athri Maharshi
Sankaradi as Thandulan
T. R. Omana as Anasooya
Nellikode Bhaskaran as Anangan
S. P. Pillai as Sunethran
Ushakumari as Saraswathi
Vijayalalitha as Dancer
Kottayam Chellappan as Maandavyan

Soundtrack
The music was composed by G. Devarajan and the lyrics were written by P. Bhaskaran.

References

External links
 

1967 films
1960s Malayalam-language films